Georgia's road network plays an important role in both domestic and international traffic with the four neighboring countries. This is expressed in the road numbering system. The country has a network of 13 internationally oriented trunk highways that connect the capital Tbilisi, home to about a third of the national population, with its four neighboring countries. This is also the backbone of a network of domestic oriented national roads connecting vital regions with each other.

The total length of the road network is approximately  according to 2021 numbers. Only a limited number of these are express roads or motorways which are in good condition. The quality of the other roads varies greatly. Signposts are in both Georgian and Latin script, but the road number prefix is ​​always in Georgian script. European E-routes are indicated on the signposts while Asian AH roads are not.

Numbering

The road numbering in Georgia consists of three layers: roads of "international" (Georgian: საერთაშორისო, saertashoriso), "domestic" (შიდასახელმწიფოებრივი, shidasakhelmts’ipoebrivi) and "local" (ადგილობრივი, adgilobrivi) importance. This system was introduced at the end of 1996, including a new list of major roads.

The law on roads defines:
 roads of international importance as roads connecting administrative, important industrial and cultural centers of Georgia with other countries;
 roads of domestic importance as roads connecting Tbilisi with cultural or economic centers, capitals of the Autonomous Republics and administrative centers of the regions, as well as accessing roads of international and domestic importance and connecting important centers of the Autonomous Republics;
 roads of local importance as roads connecting administrative centers of municipalities with their communities, roads connecting them with international and domestic roads and between communities, as well as roads connecting tourist, recreational, sporting, historical, cultural or scientific destinations with municipal centers.
These three categories are denoted by the Georgian letters ს (S), შ (Sh) and ა (A), derived from the first letter of their class:
 ს stands for "საერთაშორისო მნიშვნელობის გზა" (Saertashoriso mnishvnelobis gza, road of international importance)
 შ stands for "შიდასახელმწიფოებრივი მნიშვნელობის გზა" (Shidasakhelmts'ipoebrivi mnishvnelobis gza, road of domestic importance);
 ა stands for "ადგილობრივი მნიშვნელობის გზა" (Adgilobrivi mnishvnelobis gza, road of local importance).

The list of international (S) and domestic (Sh) roads is reviewed every 5 years according to the road law and requires government approval. Since the decentralization in 2007, local A-roads are designated by the municipalities. Each municipality manages up to hundreds of A-roads. In the Autonomous Republics of Adjara and Abkhazia, local A roads are reviewed every three years by the Autonomous Government. For Abkhazia, this is the autonomous government-in-exile recognized by Tbilisi, which effectively exercises no authority over the area.

Network

Since the introduction of the current system, the Georgian network of numbered roads has been gradually expanding. In 2011, the S13 was added as an S-trunk highway, promoted from an Sh-road, after the decision to open a new border crossing with Turkey. Adjustment in highway lengths occur due to realignments. Most of the growth in the route network is achieved with the Sh roads of domestic importance. In 2006 the amount of routes increased considerably due to a major reassessment. The table below does not specify A-roads of local importance as data is generally not very consistent or complete to create a reliable picture.  S and Sh roads fall under the responsibility of the Roads Department of the Ministry of Regional Development and Infrastructure of Georgia while local A roads are the responsibility of municipalities.

Roads of international importance

The S-roads "of international importance" are indicated by a blue shield with white letters. The expressway or motorway sections are marked with a green shield with white letters. These highways are numbered ს1 to ს13 (or S1 to S13). Eleven of these terminate at Georgia's international border, while two act as connectors within the S-network (S9 and S12). The S9 is the mandatory bypass around Tbilisi for international transit traffic between the S1, S4 and S5 highways, while the S12 connects S1 and S2 highways via a shorter route to/from Turkey. Two S-routes run partially through Abkhazia (S1) and South Ossetia (S10) regions which sections are beyond control of Georgian authorities. Through travel is not possible from/to Tbilisi controlled territory, except for foot passage into Abkhazia. However, these roads serve traffic with Russia from within both regions.

Typically they have been built as two-lane highway. Limited sections have been upgraded since 2006 to motorway and 2 or 4 lane expressway and this is gradually expanding. These upgrades are mostly related to the E60/E70 East-West Highway project, an internationally sponsored project to upgrade the (East-West) transport corridor through Georgia, connecting Azerbaijan, Armenia and Turkey. Most S-routes are part of European E-roads which are often signposted together with the Georgian road numbers. Three Asian Highway Network routes traverse Georgia, but these are not signposted.

Roads of domestic importance

The vast network of  domestic შ Sh-roads connects vital regions with each other and the capital. By far most of these routes are relatively short, but some routes are quite long, up to nearly 200 km. The longer Sh-roads are interregional in nature while others are designed as part of a subregional network, provide access to the main S-highways or remote mountain valleys. The list of Sh-routes is slowly expanding. Recent additions შ203, შ204, შ 205 and შ 208 are former parts of the S1, S2 and S12 highways, renumbered to Sh-road after realignment of sections of these highways. More of such additions can be expected with the ongoing and scheduled realignment of parts of key S-highways. At the same time, new important regional routes are being built in mountain regions and elsewhere, such as the შ 209 Sachkhere - Oni road.

The condition of Sh-roads varies from excellent to horrid. From newly sealed (asphalt) to unsealed or lacking decades of reconstruction. This mixed picture also applies to long distance Sh-routes. That said, with the limited resources the state has, some key projects have been launched since 2006, and increasingly so since 2014. The Sh7 road to Mestia in the Svaneti mountain valley and the long distance Sh31 through the southern Samtskhe-Javakheti region were key regional road projects during the tenure of 3rd President Saakashvili. In more recent years other long and medium distance roads in the regions in partially or wholly terrible shape have been reconstructed, such as the Sh16 through Racha, the Sh26 to Shatili, the Sh38 across the Gombori mountains and others. Also, the construction of regional bypasses, such as the new Sh207 Gurjaani-Bakurtsikhe Bypass, are a point of attention. Overall, the quality of the regional road network is improving with the years, but large sections remain in bad (unsealed) condition under sometimes harsh climatic conditions, especially in the mountainous regions.

Speed limits

The speed limits in Georgia are determined by the Traffic Act, Section 33.

This limit can mainly be found on a large part of the S1/E60 highway between Tbilisi and Samtredia, but also on the short motorway section of the S12.

There are a number of streets in Tbilisi, Batumi and Kutaisi where the speed limit exceeds the general  limit for built-up areas. These are for example:

History

For decades the Soviet Union lacked a systematic public numbering system for its (trunk) road network. In 1960 a list of 37 numbered "highways of national importance" across the 15 Soviet Socialist Republics was adopted. Three of these routes passed through the Georgian Soviet Socialist Republic: the 16, 17 and 19. These were canceled in 1982 with a major revision of the road numbering.

In 1982 a three-tier classification system was adopted in the Soviet Union with M, A and R routes, which laid the foundation for the current Georgian numbered trunk road network. The routes can still be found in the current Georgian network, especially the M and A roads. The M (Магистральные, Magistral'nyye, arterial) and A (Автомобильные, Avtomobil'nyye, automobile) routes "of national importance" were assigned at the federal Soviet level, while the R ("republican") routes were assigned at the SSR republic level. Cross border R-routes therefore had different numbers on either side of the internal border. The A-routes had 3 digits and were assigned according to their region: the 300 series was assigned to the Caucasus and Central Asia. The A routes had 3 digits and were assigned according to their region: the 300 series was assigned to the Caucasus and Central Asia. The R routes had 1 to 3 digits, based on their importance in the road network.

One M-route (M-27) and ten A-routes (A-301 to A-310) led through the Georgian SSR. These designations were maintained in independent Georgia until 1996/1997 when Georgia switched to their own (and current) system.

In 1997, remaining terminology of the Soviet numbering system were subtly removed from the old road law. The word "trunk road" (მაგისტრალური, magist'raluri, for M-road) was replaced with "international" and "republican" (რესპუბლიკური, resp'ublik'uri, R-road) with "domestic".

In practice this meant that most of the (Soviet) Georgian A-routes and the only M-route were reclassified and renumbered as S-roads and former R-routes as Sh-roads. The rationale behind this was that most of the M and A major roads that independent Georgia inherited from the Soviet Union in 1991 lead to the country's outer borders, in some cases with a short extension, such as the S2 and S8. As a result, the trunk road network became strongly internationally oriented.

Border checkpoints
Georgia has 14 border checkpoints for vehicular traffic with its four neighbours. Eleven of these are the terminus of an S-road, the other three connect to a domestic Sh-road.

See also
 (doc) Complete official list of Georgian Highways - 2022 update as attached to resolution 372, 18 July 2022.
 Roads Department of the Ministry of Regional Development and Infrastructure of Georgia

References